Harbin Taiping International Airport  is the international airport serving Harbin, Heilongjiang Province. The airport handled 20,431,432 passengers in 2018, making it the 20th busiest airport in mainland China.

History
It replaced the old Harbin Majiagou Airport (哈尔滨马家沟机场) that was originally built by the Japanese in 1931. In 1984, Taiping was upgraded to an international airport. Today it serves as an important transportation hub for the northeastern region of China and is the largest airport serving Heilongjiang province.

It is capable of handling 6 million passengers annually and has more than 70 air routes, both domestic and international. Currently it has one 3200 m asphalt runway.

By the flight of the Spring Airlines from June 2015, The first LCC international air routes to Nagoya, Japan began.

In 2013, Harbin Taiping International Airport handled 10 million passengers. It is the 23rd Chinese airport which reached the level of 10 million passengers per year.

In 2017, Harbin Taiping International Airport handled 18 million passengers, becoming the 21st busiest airport in Mainland China.

To handle the growing number of passengers, the new Terminal 2 opened on 30 April 2018. This terminal is for domestic flights only. All international flights were moved to the old terminal, about 1 mile to the north of Terminal 2, which is being redeveloped to handle international flights.

Description
Harbin Airport was divided into two separate terminals, International and Domestic. On 22 May 2013, in order to build Terminal 2, International Departure and Arrival has been moved to a former terminal.

Airlines and destinations

See also
List of airports in China
China's busiest airports by passenger traffic
2013 Harbin smog

References

External links
Helongjiang Airports Management Group (in Chinese)

Airports in Heilongjiang
1979 establishments in China
Transport in Harbin
Airports established in 1979